Schweinitziella is a genus of fungi in the family Trichosphaeriaceae.

The genus was circumscribed by Carlos Luis Spegazzini in Anales Soc. Ci. Argent. vol.26 on page 45 in 1888. 

The genus name of Schweinitziella is in honour of Lewis David de Schweinitz (1780–1834), who was a German-American botanist and mycologist. He is considered by some the "Father of North American Mycology".

Species
As accepted by Species Fungorum;
 Schweinitziella mirabilis 
 Schweinitziella palmigena 
 Schweinitziella perpusilla 
 Schweinitziella styracum

References

Sordariomycetes genera
Trichosphaeriales